Colle d'Anchise is a comune (municipality) in the Province of Campobasso in the Italian region Molise, located about  southwest of Campobasso.

Colle d'Anchise borders the following municipalities: Baranello, Bojano, Campochiaro, San Polo Matese, Spinete, Vinchiaturo.

References

External links
 Official website

Cities and towns in Molise